Ancient Egyptian philosophy refers to the philosophical works and beliefs of Ancient Egypt. There is some debate regarding its true scope and nature.

Notable works 

One Egyptian figure often considered an early philosopher is Ptahhotep. He served as vizier to the pharaoh in the late 25th, early 24th century BC.  Ptahhotep is known for his comprehensive work on ethical behavior and moral philosophy, called The Maxims of Ptahhotep. The work, which is believed to have been compiled by his grandson Ptahhotep Tjefi, is a series of 37 letters or maxims addressed to his son, Akhethotep, speaking on such topics as daily behavior and ethical practices.

Dag Herbjørnsrud, writing for the American Philosophical Association, describes the 3200-year-old manuscript "The Immortality of Writers", or "Be a Writer" (c. 1200 BC), as a "remarkable example of classical Egyptian philosophy." The manuscript, attributed to the writer Irsesh, states: 

Herbjørnsrud writes:
 "In 2018, projects are under way to translate several ancient Egyptian texts for the first time. Yet we already have a wide variety of genres to choose from in order to study the manuscripts from a philosophical perspective: The many maxims in “The Teaching of Ptahhotep”, the earliest preserved manuscript of this vizier of the fifth dynasty is from the 19th century BC, in which he also argues that you should “follow your heart”; “The Teaching of Ani”, written by a humble middle-class scribe in the 13th century BC, which gives advice to the ordinary man; “The Satire of the Trades” by Khety, who tries to convince his son Pepy to “love books more than your mother” as there is nothing “on earth” like being a scribe; the masterpiece “The Dispute Between a Man and His Ba” of the 19th century BC – in which a man laments “the misery of life,” while his ba (personality/soul) replies that life is good, that he should rather “ponder life” as it is a burial that is miserable – recently discussed by Peter Adamson and Chike Jeffers in their “Africana Philosophy” podcast series. Or we can read Amennakht (active in 1170–1140 BC), the leading intellectual of the scribal town Deir El-Medina, whose teaching states that “it is good to finish school, better than the smell of lotus blossoms in summer.”

Influence on Ancient Greek philosophy 

Several of the ancient Greek philosophers regarded Egypt as a place of wisdom and philosophy. Isocrates (b. 436 BC) states in Busiris that "all men agree the Egyptians are the healthiest and most long of life among men; and then for the soul they introduced philosophy's training, a pursuit which has the power, not only to establish laws, but also to investigate the nature of the universe. " He declares that Greek writers traveled to Egypt to seek knowledge. One of them was Pythagoras of Samos who "was first to bring to the Greeks all philosophy," according to Isocrates. 

Plato states in Phaedrus that the Egyptian Thoth "invented numbers and arithmetic… and, most important of all, letters.” In Plato’s Timaeus, Socrates quotes the ancient Egyptian wise men when the law-giver Solon travels to Egypt to learn: "O Solon, Solon, you Greeks are always children."  Aristotle attests to Egypt being the original land of wisdom, as when he states in Politics that "Egyptians are reputed to be the oldest of nations, but they have always had laws and a political system."

Notes and references

Bibliography
 Molefi Kete Asante, The Egyptian Philosophers: Ancient African Voices for These Times, From Imhotep to Akhenaton, Chicago, African American Images, 2000.

See also 
African philosophy
Book of Thoth
Egyptology
Isfet (Egyptian mythology)
Maat
Maxims of Ptahhotep
Middle Eastern philosophy
Philosophy in Coptic
Sebayt

 
Egyptian